Timeline of anthropology, 1970–1979

Events

1974
"Lucy", the first Australopithecus afarensis is discovered
The Canadian Ethnology Association (now the Canadian Anthropology Association) is founded
1977
The first Margaret Mead Film Festival is held

Publications
1972
Stone Age Economics, by Marshall Sahlins
The Mountain People, by Colin Turnbull

1974
Two-Dimensional Man : An Essay on the Anthropology of Power and Symbolism in Complex Society, by Abner Cohen
Cows, Pigs, Wars and Witches, by Marvin Harris
1977
Cannibals and Kings, by Marvin Harris
Reflections on Fieldwork in Morocco, by Paul Rabinow
1979
Portraits of "the Whiteman": Linguistic Play and Cultural Symbols among the Western Apache. by Keith Basso.

Births

Deaths
1972
Hilma Natalia Granqvist
Louis Leakey
Julian Steward
1974
Pedro Bosch-Gimpera1977Kaj Birket-Smith
Anna Hardwick Gayton1979Gutorn Gjessing
Robert Heizer
Theodora Kroeber

Awards1979'''
Margaret Mead Award: John Ogbu

Anthropology by decade
Anthropology
Anthropology timelines